The 2006–07 FIBA EuroCup was a professional basketball tournament in Europe. The competition is regarded as the third-strongest pan-European club basketball competition. Akasvayu Girona became the champion, after beating Azovmash Mariupol in the final.

Teams

Round I

Group A

Group B

Group C

Group D

Group E

Group F

Group G

Group H

Round II

Group I

Group J

Group K

Group L

Quarterfinals

|}

Final four

References

 
2006
2006–07 in European basketball leagues